Veliki Slatnik is a settlement in the hills east of Novo Mesto in southeastern Slovenia. The area is part of the traditional region of Lower Carniola and is now included in the Southeast Slovenia Statistical Region.

The local church in the village is dedicated to Our Lady of Sorrows and belongs to the Parish of Novo Mesto–Sveti Lenart. It was built in the late 17th century.

References

External links
Veliki Slatnik on Geopedia

Populated places in the City Municipality of Novo Mesto